Ocean Healing Group (OHG) is an international nonprofit organization that provides once-in-a-lifetime, Costa Rica-based, adaptive sports adventures and quality-of-life programs to children with disabilities.

History
Ocean Healing Group (OHG) was founded in 2007 by Frank Bauer and paralyzed professional surfer Christiaan Bailey.

JAWS program
Their flagship J.A.W.S. (Just Add Water Surfing) program is a Costa Rica-based, adaptive sports adventure program. The J.A.W.S. program is centered on physical rehabilitation through sports and activities such as surfing, snorkeling, zip-line tours, fishing, and quad riding tours and typically runs from 7 to 10 days quarterly throughout the year. The program is entirely subsidized for its participant campers and 100 percent of donations received go directly to the facilitation of programs. The JAWS program currently services disabled children with cerebral palsy, spina bifida, spinal cord injury, autism, Ataxia Telangiectasia and other conditions.

Advocacy
In addition to raising money for rehabilitative services for their campers and promoting other like-minded foundations, Ocean Healing Group also engages in public policy advocacy, spinal cord injury peer support mentor-ship as well as being on the cutting edge, in research and development of adaptive surfing equipment. OHG also holds the distinction of being both the first and only international, adaptive surfing program in the world.

Leadership
Ocean Healing Group is led by a 7-person Board of Directors as well as a 10-person Advisory Committee. Corporate Officers are CEO/Executive Director Christiaan Bailey and Board President Frank Bauer.

Accreditation
Ocean Healing Group is certified by the Internal Revenue Service as a non-profit (501c3) organization.

References

Disability organizations
Health charities in the United States
Cerebral palsy organizations
Organizations for children with health issues
Organizations established in 2007
Medical and health organizations based in Colorado
Child-related organizations in Costa Rica